Bates Point is an ice-covered headland forming the north side of the entrance to Yule Bay, along the north coast of Victoria Land, Antarctica. The geographical feature was first mapped by the United States Geological Survey from surveys and from U.S. Navy air photos, 1960–63, and named by the Advisory Committee on Antarctic Names for Lieutenant Thomas R. Bates, U.S. Navy, Flight Surgeon and Medical Officer at McMurdo Station, 1964. The point lies on the Pennell Coast, a portion of Antarctica lying between Cape Williams and Cape Adare.

References
 

Headlands of Victoria Land
Pennell Coast